Choi Eun-taek (Hangul: 최은택, Hanja: 崔殷澤; 1938 – February 5, 2007) was a South Korean football manager and former football player.

References

1938 births
2007 deaths
People from Chaeryong County
South Korean footballers
South Korean football managers
Pohang Steelers managers
Deaths from lung cancer in South Korea
Association football midfielders